Notomegabalanus decorus, the pink barnacle, is a species of acorn barnacle in the family Balanidae.

Subspecies
These subspecies belong to the species Notomegabalanus decorus:
 Notomegabalanus decorus argyllensis Buckeridge, 1983
 Notomegabalanus decorus ronarchensis Carriol, 1992

References

External links
 

Sessilia

Crustaceans described in 1854